is a 1995 Japanese comedy film directed by Yoji Yamada. It stars Kiyoshi Atsumi as Torajirō Kuruma (Tora-san), and Ruriko Asaoka as his love interest or "Madonna". Tora-san to the Rescue is the forty-eighth entry in the popular, long-running Otoko wa Tsurai yo series.

Cast
 Kiyoshi Atsumi as Torajirō
 Chieko Baisho as Sakura Suwa
 Ruriko Asaoka as Lily
 Hidetaka Yoshioka as Mitsuo Suwa
 Kumiko Goto as Izumi Oikawa
 Masami Shimojō as Kuruma Tatsuzō
 Chieko Misaki as Tsune Kuruma (Torajirō's aunt)
 Gin Maeda as Hiroshi Suwa
 Hisao Dazai as Boss (Umetarō Katsura)
 Gajirō Satō as Genkō
 Hiroshi Inuzuka as Taxi driver
 Keiroku Seki as Ponshū
 Mari Natsuki as Ayako Oikawa
 Kunie Tanaka as Ship captain

Critical appraisal
The German-language site molodezhnaja gives Tora-san to the Rescue three and a half out of five stars.

Availability
Tora-san to the Rescue was released theatrically on December 23, 1995. In Japan, the film was released on videotape in 1996 and 1997, and in DVD format in 2005 and 2008.

References

Bibliography

English

German

Japanese

External links
 Tora-san to the Rescue at www.tora-san.jp (official site)

1995 films
Films directed by Yoji Yamada
1995 comedy films
1990s Japanese-language films
Otoko wa Tsurai yo films
Japanese sequel films
Shochiku films
Films set in Kobe
Films with screenplays by Yôji Yamada
1990s Japanese films